Keltonia is a genus of plant bugs in the family Miridae. There are about 13 described species in Keltonia.

Species
These 13 species belong to the genus Keltonia:

 Keltonia balli (Knight, 1926)
 Keltonia bifurca Henry, 1991
 Keltonia clinopodii Kelton, 1966
 Keltonia knighti Kelton, 1966
 Keltonia mexicana Henry, 1991
 Keltonia pallida Henry, 1991
 Keltonia robusta Henry, 1991
 Keltonia rubrofemorata Knight, 1966
 Keltonia schaffneri Henry, 1991
 Keltonia steineri Henry, 1991
 Keltonia sulphurea (Reuter, 1907)
 Keltonia tuckeri (Poppius, 1911)
 Keltonia wheeleri Henry, 2002

References

Further reading

External links

 

Phylini
Articles created by Qbugbot